Dan Brady (born August 25, 1950) is an American former professional ice hockey goaltender.

Early life 
Brady was born in Canton, New York. He attended Boston University, where he played NCAA Division I college hockey with the Boston University Terriers men's ice hockey team from 1968 to 1972. He was selected as the most outstanding player of the 1971 NCAA University Division Men's Ice Hockey Tournament and was named to the 1971–72 NCAA (East) First All-American team. He also played for the United States national team at the 1972 Ice Hockey World Championships pool B tournament in Romania.

Career 
Brady began his professional career in 1972 by joining the Seattle Totems of the Western Hockey League. Over the next five years, he played with four teams in five leagues before retiring.

In 1992, Brady was inducted into the Boston University Hall of Fame.

Awards and honors

References

External links

1950 births
AHCA Division I men's ice hockey All-Americans
American men's ice hockey goaltenders
Boston University Terriers men's ice hockey players
Charlotte Checkers (SHL) players
Erie Blades players
Ice hockey players from New York (state)
Living people
People from Canton, New York
Seattle Totems (WHL) players
Tulsa Oilers (1964–1984) players
NCAA men's ice hockey national champions